In histopathology, a Mallory body, Mallory-Denk body, and Mallory's hyaline, is an inclusion found in the cytoplasm of liver cells.  Mallory bodies are damaged intermediate filaments within the liver cells.

Associated conditions
Mallory bodies are classically found in the livers of people suffering from alcohol-induced liver disease and were once thought to be specific for that.

They are most common in alcoholic hepatitis (prevalence of 65%) and alcoholic cirrhosis (prevalence of 51%).

They are a recognized feature of Wilson's disease (25%), primary biliary cirrhosis (24%), non-alcoholic cirrhosis (24%), hepatocellular carcinoma (23%) and morbid obesity (8%), among other conditions. However, it has also been reported in certain other unrelated conditions.

Appearance
Mallory bodies are highly eosinophilic and thus appear pink on H&E stain. The bodies themselves are made up of intermediate cytokeratin 8/18 filament proteins that have been ubiquitinated, or bound by other proteins such as heat shock proteins, or p62/Sequestosome 1.

Eponym
It is named for the American pathologist Frank Burr Mallory, who first described the structures in 1911. They were renamed as Mallory-Denk bodies in 2007 to honor the contribution of Austrian pathologist Helmut Denk for the molecular analysis of the pathogenesis of MDBs.

See also
Ballooning degeneration – another histopathologic finding of steatohepatitis.

Additional images

References

 Alcohol and health
Histopathology